Marpingen is a municipality in the district of Sankt Wendel, in Saarland, Germany. It is situated approximately 8 km west of Sankt Wendel, and 25 km north of Saarbrücken.

The municipality contains the urban areas Marpingen, Urexweiler, Alsweiler und Berschweiler, which have the status of Ortschaft, and Rheinstraße, which is in the administrative area of Marpingen, and Habenichts, which is in the administrative area of Urexweiler.

History

In 1876, at the height of the Kulturkampf, Marpingen was claimed to be the site of an apparition of the Virgin Mary, leading to a major conflict between the Prussian Government and the believers who flocked to Marpingen as a result.

See also
 Marian apparitions
 Kulturkampf

References

External links
 "The Marian apparitions at Marpingen" – multi-part summary and commentary on Blackbourn's book on the Marpingen visions
 Marpingen pilgrimage

Sankt Wendel (district)